The 1964 Montana gubernatorial election took place on November 3, 1964. Incumbent Governor of Montana Tim M. Babcock, who became Governor upon the death of previous Governor Donald Grant Nutter, ran for re-election. He won the Republican primary unopposed, and advanced to the general election, where he faced Roland Renne, the former President of Montana State College and the Democratic nominee, in the general election. Despite the fact that then-President Lyndon B. Johnson won the state handily in that year's presidential election, Babcock managed to narrowly defeat Renne to win his second and final term as governor.

Democratic primary

Candidates
Roland Renne, former President of Montana State College
Mike Kuchera, furniture dealer

Results

Republican primary

Candidates
Tim M. Babcock, incumbent Governor of Montana

Results

General election

Results

References

Montana
Gubernatorial
1964
November 1964 events in the United States